Jeffrey Joseph Folkins is an American physicist.

Folkins earned a degree in physics from Harvey Mudd College in 1976 and later attended the University of Pennsylvania, graduating with a doctorate in December 1981. He subsequently worked for Xerox. In 1999, Folkins was elected a fellow of the American Physical Society "[f]or applications of physics to electrophotography resulting in major innovations in the design of development subsystems and in color Xerographic marking systems."

References

20th-century American physicists
Harvey Mudd College alumni
Xerox people
University of Pennsylvania alumni
Fellows of the American Physical Society
Year of birth missing (living people)
Living people